Vítor Hugo da Costa Ferreira (born 27 February 1986), known as Vitor Hugo, is a Portuguese former footballer.

References

1986 births
Living people
Portuguese footballers
C.D. Trofense players
Association football forwards
AD Fafe players
C.F. União players
A.D. Sanjoanense players
Leça F.C. players